The 2008 Uttarakhand Municipal general elections and 2008 Uttarakhand Panchayat general elections were held in the Indian state of Uttarakhand.

Elections are not held in the nagar panchayats of Badrinath, Kedarnath and Gangotri due to their status of temporary settlements. Local interim administration councils administer these three pilgrimage sites for a period of six months during the summers.

Results

Municipal Corporation Mayoral result

Municipal general election results

Panchayat general election results

See also
2008 Dehradun Municipal Corporation election
2008 elections in India

References

 http://sec.uk.gov.in/files/election-2013/58_Adhisuchana.pdf
 http://sec.uk.gov.in/files/election-2013/Adhisoochna_2013.pdf

Local elections in Uttarakhand
2008 elections in India